Hemiscopis is a genus of moths of the family Crambidae.

Species
Hemiscopis expansa (Warren, 1892)
Hemiscopis intermedialis (Munroe, 1977)
Hemiscopis lophopedalis (de Joannis, 1927)
Hemiscopis purpureum (Inoue, 1982)
Hemiscopis sanguinea (Bänziger, 1987)
Hemiscopis suffusalis (Walker, 1866)
Hemiscopis violacea (T. P. Lucas, 1892)

References

Odontiinae
Crambidae genera
Taxa named by William Warren (entomologist)